3Fun (3FUN) is a location-based mobile online dating application for Android and iOS. 3Fun is available in the United States, United Kingdom, Brazil, the Netherlands, and several other countries. As of May 2019, there were approximately 100,000 monthly downloads, and more than 2 million total downloads. In January 2022, 3Fun partnered with British security company DigitalXRAID to implement penetration testing.

See also 
Comparison of online dating services
Feeld
Grindr
Scruff
Spoonr

References

External links

Mobile social software
Online dating for specific interests
Online dating services of Canada